Adeline Maria Gray (born January 15, 1991) is an American freestyle wrestler who currently competes at 76 kilograms. She is a six-time world champion (2012, 2014, 2015, 2018, 2019, 2021) and a two-time Olympian (2016, 2020), with the silver medal in her event at the 2020 Summer Olympics. She is the first American woman to win back-to-back wrestling world titles since Tricia Saunders in 1998 and 1999. She is also the first American woman wrestler to win six world championships.

Early life
Gray was born on January 15, 1991, in Denver, Colorado to George and Donna Gray, and has three younger sisters, including fellow wrestler Geneva Gray and began her wrestling career with the help of her father.

Career
On September 27, 2012, Gray competed in the 2012 Women's World Wrestling Championships in Edmonton, Canada. In her first match against Dzhanan Manolova of Bulgaria, Adeline came out a little slow, then exploded with a great 3 point throw and won the 1st period 3–0. In the second period, she took Manolova down and turned her in a leg lace for another point, then she just defended the rest of the period for a 2–0 win. In the next round, she faced off against Yoshiko Inoue of Japan, the only one to score on Adeline. Inoue scored first in the first period but Adeline came back and scored on a push out to secure the first period win. In the second period, Adeline looked in control with her under hooks, scoring a throw-by and getting her leg lace for a 3–0 win. In the Semi-Finals against Kaur Navjot of India, she looked very confident and showed no fear and dominated Navjot from the start. Adeline secured her second takedown and controlled her legs standing tilts to a stack for the pin.
 
In the Finals, Gray faced off against the 2012 Jr World Champion, Dorothy Yeats of Canada, only 19 years old and the crowd favorite. Adeline came out very confident and took it to Yeats, throwing her for 3 points and scoring in another takedown to win the 1st period 4–0. In the second period, Adeline stayed in control and secured a takedown late in the period, then put Yeats on her back with her signature arm-bar-wing and pinned her with 4 seconds left for a dominating win.

Gray competed in the 75 kg event at the 2016 Summer Olympics, where she won her first match against Andrea Olaya of Colombia, but lost her quarterfinal match against Vasilisa Marzaliuk of Belarus.

Gray spent the 2017 season recuperating from injuries, missing the 2017 World Championships.

She returned from her injuries in 2018, winning gold at the 2018 World Wrestling Championships. In 2019, she won gold at the 2019 Pan American Wrestling Championships. Later that year, she won her fifth gold medal at the World Wrestling Championships, becoming the first American wrestler to win five golds at the World Championships. She won silver at the 2020 Pan American Wrestling Championships, winning her first two matches, before withdrawing from her gold medal match against Justina Di Stasio of Canada due to rib fractures.

At the 2020 U.S. Olympic Wrestling Trials, Gray defeated Kylie Welker by technical superiority twice, qualifying to represent the United States at the 2020 Summer Olympics. In her opening bout, she won by fall against 2020 African Wrestling Championships gold medalist Zaineb Sghaier. In the quarterfinals, she defeated former world champion and four-time European champion Yasemin Adar by a score of 6–4. In the semifinals, she defeated two-time Asian Wrestling Championships finalist Aiperi Medet Kyzy by a score of 3–2. She was awarded a silver medal after being defeated by former world champion Aline Rotter-Focken by a score of 7–3 in the gold medal match.

In 2021, she won the gold medal in the women's 76 kg event at the 2021 World Wrestling Championships held in Oslo, Norway.

Endorsements
Gray is the first female wrestler to have her own signature shoe. The ASICS Aggressor 3 L.E. Adeline Gray wrestling shoe is a special edition signature shoe designed by Adeline.

Personal life
Outside of competing, and while women's wrestling was created to combat sexism and receives an extraordinary amount of support from the institution of wrestling, Gray has been wrestling the bigger issues of sexism, and promoting equal recognition and participation on the elite levels, including Olympic and collegiate level wrestling.

International matches
{| class="wikitable"
|-
! Res.
! Record
! Opponent
! Score
! Date
! Event
! Location
|-
! style=background:white colspan=8 | 
|-
| Win
| 52-5
| align=left |  Epp Mae
| style="font-size:88%"|Fall (6-4)
| style="font-size:88%" rowspan=4|October 4, 2021
| style="font-size:88%" rowspan=4|2021 World Wrestling Championships
| style="text-align:left;font-size:88%;" rowspan=4|  Oslo
|-
| Win
| 51-5
| align=left |  Samar Amer
| style="font-size:88%"|Fall (11-1)
|-
| Win
| 50-5
| align=left |  Kiran Bishnoi
| style="font-size:88%"|Fall (5-0)
|-
| Win
| 49-5
| align=left |  Ayşegül Özbege
| style="font-size:88%"|Fall (4-0)
|-
! style=background:white colspan=8 | 
|-
| Loss
| 48-5
| align=left |  Aline Rotter-Focken
| style="font-size:88%"|7-3
| style="font-size:88%" rowspan=4|August 2, 2021
| style="font-size:88%" rowspan=4|2021 Olympic Games
| style="text-align:left;font-size:88%;" rowspan=4|  Tokyo
|-
| Win
| 48-4
| align=left |  Aiperi Medet Kyzy
| style="font-size:88%"|3-2
|-
| Win
| 47-4
| align=left |  Yasemin Adar
| style="font-size:88%"|6-4
|-
| Win
| 46-4
| align=left |  Zaineb Sghaier
| style="font-size:88%"|Fall 2:11
|-
! style=background:white colspan=8 | 
|-
| Win
| 45-4
| align=left |  Aline Ferreira
| style="font-size:88%"|8-0
| style="font-size:88%" rowspan=4|May 27, 2021
| style="font-size:88%" rowspan=4|2021 Pan American Wrestling Championships
| style="text-align:left;font-size:88%;" rowspan=4|  Guatemala City
|-
| Win
| 44-4
| align=left |  Luisa Mosquera
| style="font-size:88%"|Forfeit (0-0)
|-
| Win
| 43-4
| align=left |  Josselyn Portillo
| style="font-size:88%"|Fall (4-0)
|-
| Win
| 42-4
| align=left |  Genesis Reasco Valdez
| style="font-size:88%"|Tech Fall (12-2)
|-
! style=background:white colspan=7 | 
|-
| Loss
| 41-4
| align=left |  Justina Di Stasio
| style="font-size:88%"|Injury default (0-0)
| style="font-size:88%" rowspan=3|March 14, 2020
| style="font-size:88%" rowspan=3|2020 Pan American Wrestling Championships
| style="text-align:left;font-size:88%;" rowspan=3|  Ottawa
|-
| Win
| 41–3
| align=left |  Andrea Olaya
| style="font-size:88%"|Tech Fall (11–0)
|-
| Win
| 40–3
| align=left |  Andrimar Daniela Lazaro Diaz
| style="font-size:88%"|2–0
|-
! style=background:white colspan=8 | 
|-
| Win
| 39–3
| align=left |  Hiroe Minagawa
| style="font-size:88%"|4–2
| style="font-size:88%"|September 19, 2019
| style="font-size:88%" rowspan=5|2019 World Championships
| style="text-align:left;font-size:88%;" rowspan=5|  Nur-Sultan
|-
| Win
| 38–3
| align=left |  Aline Rotter-Focken
| style="font-size:88%"|5–2
| style="font-size:88%" rowspan=4|September 18, 2019
|-
| Win
| 37–3
| align=left |  Chang Hui-tsz
| style="font-size:88%"|Tech Fall (10–0)
|-
| Win
| 36–3
| align=left |  Elmira Syzdykova
| style="font-size:88%"|Tech Fall (10–0)
|-
| Win
| 35–3
| align=left |  Eleni Pjollaj
| style="font-size:88%"|Tech Fall (10–0)
|-
! style=background:white colspan=8 | 
|-
| Win
| 34–3
| align=left |  Genesis Reasco Valdez
| style="font-size:88%"|Fall
| style="font-size:88%" rowspan=4|April 21, 2019
| style="font-size:88%" rowspan=4|2019 Pan American Wrestling Championships
| style="text-align:left;font-size:88%;" rowspan=4|  Buenos Aires
|-
| Win
| 33–3
| align=left |  Mabelkis Capote
| style="font-size:88%"|Tech Fall (10–0)
|-
| Win
| 32–3
| align=left |  Erica Wiebe
| style="font-size:88%"|Tech Fall (10–0)
|-
| Win
| 31–3
| align=left |  María Acosta
| style="font-size:88%"|Tech Fall (10–0)
|-
! style=background:white colspan=8 | 
|-
| Win
| 30–3
| align=left |  Yasemin Adar
| style="font-size:88%"|Tech Fall (13–1)
| style="font-size:88%" |October 24, 2018
| style="font-size:88%" rowspan=4|2018 World Championships
| style="text-align:left;font-size:88%;" rowspan=4|  Budapest
|-
| Win
| 29–3
| align=left |  Erica Wiebe
| style="font-size:88%"|3–1
| style="font-size:88%" rowspan=3|October 23, 2018
|-
| Win
| 28–3
| align=left |  Elmira Syzdykova
| style="font-size:88%"|Fall
|-
| Win
| 27–3
| align=left |  Epp Mäe
| style="font-size:88%"|Tech Fall (10–0)
|-
! style=background:white colspan=8 | 
|-
| Win
| 26-2
| align=left |  Andrea Olaya
| style="font-size:88%"|Fall (10-1)
| style="font-size:88%" rowspan=3|May 3, 2018
| style="font-size:88%" rowspan=3|2018 Pan-American Wrestling Championships
| style="text-align:left;font-size:88%;" rowspan=3|  Lima
|-
| Win
| 25–2
| align=left |  Aline Ferreira
| style="font-size:88%"|Fall (4-0)
|-
| Win
| 24–2
| align=left |  Mabelkis Capote
| style="font-size:88%"|Fall (4-0)
|-
! style=background:white colspan=8 | 
|-
| Loss
| 23–3
| align=left |  Vasilisa Marzaliuk
| style="font-size:88%"|1–4
| style="font-size:88%" rowspan=2|August 18, 2016
| style="font-size:88%" rowspan=2|2016 Summer Olympics
| style="text-align:left;font-size:88%;" rowspan=2|  Rio de Janeiro
|-
| Win
| 23–2
| align=left |  Andrea Olaya
| style="font-size:88%"|Fall
|-
! style=background:white colspan=8 | 
|-
| Win
| 22–2
| align=left |  Zhou Qian
| style="font-size:88%"|Tech Fall (13–2)
| style="font-size:88%" rowspan=5| September 10, 2015
| style="font-size:88%" rowspan=5|2015 World Championships
| style="text-align:left;font-size:88%;" rowspan=5|  Las Vegas, NV
|-
| Win
| 21–2
| align=left |  Aline Ferreira
| style="font-size:88%"|10–2
|-
| Win
| 20–2
| align=left |  Daria Osocka
| style="font-size:88%"|Tech Fall (10–0)
|-
| Win
| 19–2
| align=left |  Vasilisa Marzaliuk
| style="font-size:88%"|6–0
|-
| Win
| 18–2
| align=left |  Gelegjamtsyn Naranchimeg
| style="font-size:88%"|Tech Fall (10–0)
|-
! style=background:white colspan=8 | 
|-
| Win
| 17–2
| align=left |  Justina Di Stasio
| style="font-size:88%"|7–6
| style="font-size:88%" rowspan=3| July 17, 2015
| style="font-size:88%" rowspan=3|2015 Pan American Games Champion
| style="text-align:left;font-size:88%;" rowspan=3|  Toronto, ON
|-
| Win
| 16–2
| align=left |  Ana Gonzalez
| style="font-size:88%"|Tech Fall (12–0)
|-
| Win
| 15–2
| align=left |  Aline Ferreira
| style="font-size:88%"|Tech Fall (10–0)
|-
! style=background:white colspan=8 | 
|-
| Win
| 14–2
| align=left |  Aline Ferreira
| style="font-size:88%"|2–1
| style="font-size:88%" rowspan=5| September 11, 2014
| style="font-size:88%" rowspan=5|2014 World Championship
| style="text-align:left;font-size:88%;" rowspan=5|  Tashkent
|-
| Win
| 13–2
| align=left |  Epp Mäe
| style="font-size:88%"|5–1
|-
| Win
| 12–2
| align=left |  Hiroe Suzuki
| style="font-size:88%"|2–1
|-
| Win
| 11–2
| align=left |  Yasemin Adar
| style="font-size:88%"|Fall
|-
| Win
| 10–2
| align=left |  Zhou Qian
| style="font-size:88%"|11–10
|-
! style=background:white colspan=8 | 
|-
| Win
| 9–2
| align=left |  Yasemin Adar
| style="font-size:88%"|8–2
| style="font-size:88%" rowspan=4| September 20, 2013
| style="font-size:88%" rowspan=4|2013 World Championship
| style="text-align:left;font-size:88%;" rowspan=4|  Budapest
|-
| Win
| 8–2
| align=left |  Guzel Manyurova
| style="font-size:88%"|2–1
|-
| Loss
| 7–2
| align=left |  Zhang Fengliu
| style="font-size:88%"|2–1
|-
| Win
| 7–1
| align=left |  Andrea Olaya
| style="font-size:88%"|Fall
|-
! style=background:white colspan=8 | 
|-
| Win
| 6–1
| align=left |  Dorothy Yeats
| style="font-size:88%"|Fall
| style="font-size:88%" rowspan=4| September 26, 2012
| style="font-size:88%" rowspan=4|2012 World Championship
| style="text-align:left;font-size:88%;" rowspan=4|  Strathcona County, AL
|-
| Win
| 5–1
| align=left |  Navjot Kaur
| style="font-size:88%"|Fall
|-
| Win
| 4–1
| align=left |  Yoshiko Inoue
| style="font-size:88%"|1–1, 3–0
|-
| Win
| 3–1
| align=left |  Dzhanan Manolova
| style="font-size:88%"|2–0, 3–0
|-
! style=background:white colspan=8 | 
|-
| Win
| 2–1
| align=left |  Burcu Örskaya
| style="font-size:88%"|1–0, 1–0
| style="font-size:88%" rowspan=3| September 16, 2011
| style="font-size:88%" rowspan=3|2011 World Championship
| style="text-align:left;font-size:88%;" rowspan=3|  Istanbul
|-
| Win
| 1–1
| align=left |  Martine Dugrenier
| style="font-size:88%"|1–1, 3–1
|-
| Loss
| 0–1
| align=left |  Xiluo Zhuoma
| style="font-size:88%"|1–4, 0–1
|-

References

External links
 
 
 
 
 

1991 births
Living people
Sportspeople from Denver
American female sport wrestlers
Olympic wrestlers of the United States
Wrestlers at the 2016 Summer Olympics
Pan American Games medalists in wrestling
Pan American Games gold medalists for the United States
Wrestlers at the 2015 Pan American Games
World Wrestling Championships medalists
Medalists at the 2015 Pan American Games
Pan American Wrestling Championships medalists
Wrestlers at the 2020 Summer Olympics
Medalists at the 2020 Summer Olympics
Olympic silver medalists for the United States in wrestling
21st-century American women
20th-century American women